The Toyota Super Corollas were a multi-titled basketball team in the Philippine Basketball Association (PBA) from 1975 to 1983. Founded in 1973 by businessman and sportsman Dante Silverio, the team - formally named Toyota Athletic Club - was owned by Delta Motor Corporation (defunct) and played under various names -  Komatsu Komets, Toyota Comets, Toyota Silver Tamaraws, Toyota Tamaraws, Toyota Superdiesels, Toyota Super Corollas and Toyota Silver Coronas.

In the PBA, it won nine championships, the sixth most in PBA history behind the San Miguel Beermen (24), the Alaska Aces (14), fierce rival Crispa Redmanizers, the Purefoods franchise (13) and Barangay Ginebra San Miguel (11).

Profile and franchise 

The team debuted in April 1973 as the Komatsu Komets for the PANAMIN basketball tournament. In June 1973, it joined the Manila Industrial and Commercial Athletic Association (MICAA) as the Toyota Comets and emerged as champions in its maiden tournament. In January 1975, five MICAA teams met together at the old Elizalde & Company canteen to sign a pre-organizational agreement for the formation of what is now known as the Philippine Basketball Association. Dante Silverio, Ricardo Silverio's nephew, was the official representative of Toyota who signed on the dotted line.

In November 1976, the team changed its name to the Toyota Silver Tamaraws. In the 1977 season, the name was shortened to the Toyota Tamaraws. That same year, the Silverio group debuted its new MICAA team, Crown Motor Sales (later playing in 1979 as Frigidaire and MAN Diesel). The MICAA team, like their PBA counterparts, were likewise successful in the MICAA and was one of three the powerhouse teams of the MICAA, along with Solid Mills and Imperial Textile Mills (ITM). 

In 1978, FILMANBANK, a bank owned by the Silverio group, joined the PBA after acquiring the 7-Up Uncolas' franchise. In the process, the Tamaraws secured the biggest name of the Uncolas at that time, a 5'9 dynamo named Danny Florencio (who used to play for Crispa in the MICAA), since FILMANBANK allowed their most prized player to be released to their sister team. Prior to that, Florencio sizzled with a league high 64 points in a game of 7-Up despite having two American import teammates in 7'0 Steve Stroud and 6'7 Chris MacMurray playing alongside him. Florencio, who was just involved in the first ever player trade conducted by the league in 1977, came from U/Tex along with Jimmy Otazu in lieu of the Uncolas' Tino Reynoso and Ulysses Rodríguez.

In 1981, the team was renamed the Toyota Super Corollas. When the 1983 season unfolded, they changed their name to the Toyota Silver Coronas but reverted to the Toyota Super Corollas during the 1983 Open Conference. After the 1983 season, they traded longtime starting power forward Abe King to the San Miguel in order to cut the total payroll.

However, reeling from corporate losses brought about by the prevailing economic crisis, the team came to an end when Delta Motor Corporation sold its PBA franchise to the Lucio Tan group on February 14, 1984. The new franchise debuted in the PBA as Beer Hausen in 1984.

Playing style
In a time when defense was defined as “an individual's effort to stop or stymie the opposing team's counterpart”, Toyota's playing style was considered one of the most glamorous and worthy to watch. With team defense hardly known back then, Toyota was a typical run-and-gun team that depended heavily on their rebounding prowess. Hence, when you have an Andrew Fields, Bruce King, John Irving, Abe King, Ramon Fernandez and even a Bobby Jaworski collaring the rebounds, the most common (and very entertaining) spectacle was to see a baseball pass by the rebounder to a streaking player on the break for an easy twinner. Notables among the recipients of the baseball pass over the years in the Toyota lineup included Segura, Cortez, Tuadles, Arnaiz, and Legaspi. In the halfcourt, it was not uncommon to see a similar play that Fernandez and Jaworski employed in the recent Crispa-Toyota reunion game where Fernandez would post up, Jaworski would stay at the top of the arc and wait for Fernandez to be double-teamed. Once the double team is consummated, Jaworski either waits at the 3 point line or makes a straight cut in the middle of the lanes waiting for the blind pass of Fernandez for an easy two. Another common sight was to see Jaworski mapping out the play, cuts in the middle and makes the interior defense commit to him. He then throws a behind-the-back blind pass to cutting slotmen like Fernandez or King for an easy layup or throws it back to good buddy Arnaiz for a long range bomb shot from the arc. Hence, it wasn't a surprise to see Jaworski, Arnaiz and Fernandez (in that order) being the first 3 PBA players to dish off 2,000 assists in their careers.

For defense, Toyota's starting unit had a better defensive stance against their counterparts in Crispa. Jaworski, Fernandez and King anchored the defense. Crispa, however had the edge at the bench since they had noted defensive aces like Padim Israel, Joy Dionisio, Yoyoy Villamin, Bay Cristobal (especially in 1983 under Coach Tommy Manotoc) while Toyota had to contend with Herrera, Javier, Coloso and Bulaong to provide the defensive spunk.

Team highlights 
Toyota, more than Crispa, was hounded with more controversies throughout their nine seasons in the league. There is no compelling reason for such, except that probably, Toyota's individual players were known to be more “independent-minded” while Crispa's superstars submitted to their team owner Danny Floro. Jaworski, who eventually became larger than life in the PBA, was involved in majority of these controversies, as well as Fernandez. 
 In December 1979, Dante Silverio resigned as the team's head coach after management decided to reinstate players Fernandez, Estoy Estrada and Abe King in Game 2 of the 3rd Conference finals. Silverio deliberately didn't field any of these players in the 3rd Conference after claiming that the three deliberately “didn't play their best” in a losing finals stint against Royal Tru Orange in the 2nd Conference. The Orangemen, then coached by Eduardo Ocampo (who took over Toyota at the start of the 1981 season) and led by imports Otto Moore and Larry Pounds, decisively beat the Tamaraws in four games of a best of five series to earn their first title. Notable players in the RTO fold included Rudy Lalota, Tony Torrente, Leo Paguntalan, Biboy Ravanes, Badong Ramas, Jess Migalbin (the father of Richard Yee), and Rosalio “Yoyong” Martirez. Toyota eventually won the 3rd Conference title, their 6th since 1975, beating Crispa in four games. The team was led by their imports Andrew Fields and Bruce “Sky” King while Crispa was powered by Bernard Harris (who played for Tanduay the year before) and Irving Chatman.
 In April 1977, the Comets and the Redmanizers were involved in a post-game rumble at the Big Dome that saw both protagonists being sent and jailed at the Fort Bonifacio. At a time when the players' notion of winning a game was “at all costs”, especially in a Crispa-Toyota game, it was not uncommon to find these two teams involved in several rumbles. The very first fight actually happened back in 1975 between the two teams and led by Toyota's notorious bad boy Oscar Rocha. The apex came in 1977 when players like Fernandez and Co were mixing up at each other despite the presence of cops in the dugout.
The story of the longest 16 seconds in league history would happen in 1980 featuring the Toyota Tamaraws and the U/Tex Wranglers. The two teams tangled in the Finals of the Open Conference title with U/Tex having the privilege of playing their two imports side by side with each other. The two, Glenn McDonald and Aaron James, combined forces with Bogs Adornado, Lim Eng Beng and the diminutive Ricky Pineda to form a solid starting unit. Toyota of course had their resident import Andy Fields partnered with another old reliable in King. In Game 4 of the series and U/Tex ahead 2–1, Tommy Manotoc pulled out all his starters and sent in his shock troopers with more than 7 minutes remaining in the game and the Tamaraws up by only 9 points. Reporters bitterly criticized Manotoc's move for conceding the game at such an early stage, but Manotoc justified this by saying the most famous quote, "one step backwards, two steps forward" in reference to the tactic of relieving his star players and giving them enough time to rest in preparation for the all important Game 5. Toyota won Game 4 handily of course. In Game 5, with time down to 16 seconds, U/Tex in possession and Toyota ahead by four 94–90, the 16-second miracle happened. Upon receipt of the inbound pass from Lim Eng Beng, Aaron James cranked up a jumper from 18 feet to bring the game closer by 2, time down to 11 seconds. Toyota had possession, inbounded from the endline, but the full court press of U/Tex somehow added pressure to the Tamaraws. Instead of just holding on to the ball and waiting for a foul while watching the time tick away, the Tamaraws made one hurried pass after another until it reached the frontcourt. In the ensuing play, Arnie Tuadles made a pass to Abe King, who was unmolested in the paint, but his pass was read well by McDonald, who intercepted the ball. Francis Arnaiz, in haste, fouled McDonald in penalty instead of putting up a solid defense against the 6-foot, 6-inch former Celtic. McDonald proved once again that his 1976 championship performance with Boston was no fluke and sank both free throws with time down to 2 seconds left. The game was tied and Toyota couldn't buy a basket in the remaining seconds, forcing the game into overtime, the very first recorded OT in Game 5 in PBA History (and probably the only one to date). At the end of 5 minutes of extension, U/Tex saw itself at the winning end with a 99–98 victory against the Tamaraws.
In December 1980, Crispa was at the threshold of winning the 1980 All Filipino Conference in unbeaten fashion. They had already won 19 straight – 9 in the eliminations, 8 in the semifinals, and the first 2 games of the finals series against arch rivals Toyota. In Game 3, and behind by three points at halftime, Toyota team manager Pablo Carlos fired Coach Fort Acuña on the spot for refusing to heed Carlos' demand thrice to field in Robert Jaworski in the game. The feud between Acuña and Jaworski was never revealed, although rumors at that time said that their differences were “professional transcending into the personal.” Jaworski re-entered the court at the start of the 3rd canto with Carlos coaching, and although didn't exactly play well, emotionally lifted the Tamaraws to a hotly contested 97–94 victory against the Redmanizers, spoiling Crispa's chances to win the crown unbeaten. Crispa eventually won Game 4, 105-91 and ended the conference with a 20-1 slate.
In July 1982, the Super Corollas and the visiting national team of South Korea were involved in a bench-clearing free for all that saw several players being thrown out of the game and getting suspended. It happened in Game 2 in the battle for third place between South Korea and Toyota. The Sokors won Game 1 and Toyota needed to beat the visitors to force Game 3. In an ensuing play, leading Rookie of the Year candidate Antero Saldana kicked South Korean forward Li Min Hyun in the body. As a consequence, Saldana was disqualified from the ROY race. The award went to another Saldana (no relation to Antero), San Miguel point guard Marte Saldana. San Miguel won the title, beating Crispa in Game 3. This was the only conference in 1982 where they failed to win, thereby losing their hopes of a similar grand slam victory won by Crispa in 1976 and followed up in 1983.
In February 1984, the Toyota franchise officially took a leave of absence from the league after suffering from huge losses in terms of revenues. This also forced the hand of then team manager Jack Rodríguez (who replaced Ricky Silverio, Jr., the son of the team owner who replaced Carlos) to sell the franchise to Beer Hausen of Lucio Tan's Asia Brewery. The lock, stock and barrel deal stated that all Toyota players will be sold as well, to be led by no less than their starting center Ramon Fernandez. Robert Jaworski and Francis Arnaiz balked at the sale, refusing to heed the contract to which they were bound. This made Arnaiz utter “di kami por kilo” (not to be sold like cattle), in reference to the non-transparent ways that Delta Motor Corporation sold the team without informing the players. With the controversy becoming even bigger as the days wore on, Gilbey's Gin (La Tondeña) team owner Carlos “Honeyboy” Palanca, III, who was also the PBA President at the time, decided to secure Jaworski. Jaworski was joined by Arnaiz in the La Tondeña franchise, while Chito Loyzaga and Arnie Tuadles were taken in by Great Taste Coffee. Prior to the sale of the Toyota team, Abe King joined San Miguel Beer (to renamed Gold Eagle Beer). The majority of the Toyota players led by Fernandez went to Beer Hausen.

Season-by-season records

Awards

Individual awards

Notable playersIn alphabetical order. Members of PBA Hall of Fame and PBA's Greatest Players are in boldface.''

 Francis Arnaiz - #8 (1973-1983)
 Ramon Fernandez - #10 (1973-1983)
 Danilo "Danny" Florencio  - #22, #44 (1978-1982)
 Robert Jaworski''' - #7 (1973-1983)
 Fortunato Acuña  - #17 (1973-1978)
 Orlando Bauzon  - #9 (1973-1977)
 Nicanor "Nick" Bulaong - #20 (1977-1983)
 Aurelio "Boy" Clariño - #23 (1975-1976)
 Timoteo "Tim" Coloso - #13 (1982-1983)
 Roberto Concepcion - #5 (1973-1975)
 Edgardo Cordero - #88 (1983)
 Virgilio "Gil" Cortez - #16 (1976-1977)  1976 PBA Rookie of the Year
 Ernesto "Estoy" Estrada  - #5 (1978-1979)
 Leopoldo "Pol" Herrera - #41 (1980-1983)
 Pablo Javier - #12 (1977-1980)
 Abe King, Jr. - #6 (1977-1983)
 Emerito "Emer" Legaspi - #18 (1977-1983)
 Joaquin "Chito" Loyzaga - #4 (1983)
 Rolly Marcelo - #6 (1975)
 Eduardo Merced - #9 (1980-1981)
 Ricardo "Ricky" Relosa - #15 (1982-1983)
 Alberto "Big Boy" Reynoso  - #4 (1973-1976)
 Cristino "Tino" Reynoso  - #14 (1973-1976)
 Oscar Rocha - #11, #45 (1977)
 Ulysses Rodriguez - #6 (1973-1975)
 Joaquin "Jake" Rojas  - #22 (1975-1976)
 Quirino "Rino" Salazar - #14 (1977-1979)
 Antero "Terry" Saldana - #17 (1982-1983)
 Rodolfo "Ompong" Segura - #15 (1973-1976)
 Jess Sta. Maria - #13 (1977-1979)
 Elias Tolentino  - #21 (1975)
 Arnulfo "Arnie" Tuadles  - #11 (1979-1983) 1979 PBA Rookie of the Year

MICAA (1973-1974):
Ed Camus - #13 (1973-1974)
Nat Canson - #12  (1973-1974)
Joseph Galonga - #18 (1973)
Bot Acosta - #16 (1973)

Imports
 Ralph Brewster - #34 (1983)
 Stan "Sweet" Cherry - #30 (1975)
 Arnold Dugger  - #30 (1982)
 Andrew Fields - #1 (1979-1983)
 John Irving - #34 (1977)
 Byron "Snake" Jones - #33 (1975-1976)
 Bruce "Sky" King  - #11, #111, #43 (1977-1980)
 Victor King - #34 (1981, replacement of Melton Wertz)
 Donnie Ray Koonce - #30 (1982, replacement of Arnold Dugger)
 Kevin Porter - #2 (1983)
 TJ Robinson - #33 (1978)
 Howard Smith - #35 (1976)
 Archie Talley - #13 (1981)
 Carlos Terry  - #42 (1978, replacement of TJ Robinson)
 Julius Wayne - #3 (1983, replacement of Kevin Porter)
 Melton Wertz - #33 (1981)

Head coaches
Nilo Verona - 1973
Dante Silverio - 1974-1979
Fortunato Acuña - 1979-1980
Edgardo Ocampo - 1981-1983

Team managers 
Dante Silverio - 1973
 Butch SyQuia - 1974-1979
Pablo P. Carlos Jr. - 1979-1980
Ricardo S. Silverio, Jr. - 1981-1982
Joaquín C. Rodríguez - 1983

See also
 Crispa–Toyota rivalry

References

External links
Team pictures
Toyota ends Philippine Tie

 
Basketball teams established in 1973
Basketball teams disestablished in 1984
Defunct Philippine Basketball Association teams
Manila Industrial and Commercial Athletic Association teams
1973 establishments in the Philippines
1984 disestablishments in the Philippines